Thomas Beckett Rentschler (August 23, 1932 – October 25, 2016) was a member of the Ohio House of Representatives. Rentschler was a graduate of Haverford College in Pennsylvania, and a veteran of the U.S. Navy.  He served as chairman and CEO of Citizens Bank for more than 30 years. He died after a short illness at a hospice in Hamilton, Ohio in 2016.

References

1932 births
2016 deaths
Republican Party members of the Ohio House of Representatives
Politicians from Hamilton, Ohio
Haverford College alumni
Businesspeople from Ohio
20th-century American businesspeople